Patriarch Alexy I (Alexius I, secular name Sergey Vladimirovich Simansky, ;  – 17 April 1970) was the 13th Patriarch of Moscow and all Rus', Primate of the Russian Orthodox Church (ROC) between 1945 and 1970.

Life
Born in Moscow to a noble family, his father was a Chamberlain of the Russian Imperial Court. In 1899 he graduated from Moscow Imperial University with a law degree; was conscripted by the army and served in a grenadier regiment. In 1902 he enrolled at Moscow Theological Academy and by 1906 he had been elevated to the dignity of archimandrite and was appointed rector of the seminary at Tula.

After the Bolshevik Revolution he was arrested several times and in 1922 exiled to Kazakhstan. In 1926 he returned to Saint Petersburg (which had been renamed Leningrad) and was appointed Archbishop of Khutyn, that is, the vicar of the Diocese of Novgorod.

On July 29, 1927, Metropolitan Sergei Stragorodsky, acting as de facto head of the Russian Orthodox Church, signed a statement of unconditional loyalty to the Soviet State. The statement was co-signed by all members of the Holy Synod, and Archbishop Alexy of Khutyn.

He ran the diocese for much of the next seven years while Metropolitan Arsenius Stadnitsky was in prison or exile. In 1933 Alexius served briefly as Archbishop of Novgorod (for several months) and then metropolitan of Leningrad.

In the early hours of September 5, 1943, Metropolitan Alexius together with Metropolitan Sergius and Metropolitan Nicholas (Yarushevich) met with Joseph Stalin in the Kremlin where a historic decision was made regarding the fate of the Church in the state ruled by the militantly atheist Communist party. In the midst of World War II Stalin decided to allow the Russian Orthodox Church to legally function again after two decades of severe persecution. Restrictions on the Patriarchate of Moscow were relaxed somewhat and many churches throughout the Soviet Union were re-opened. Stalin tried to appeal to patriotic feelings of the Russian people especially the peasantry (backbone of the Red Army), many of whom grew up in still deeply religious families.

When Patriarch Sergei died on May 15, 1944, Metropolitan Alexy took his place as Patriarchal locum tenens. In his first statement after assuming control of the Church, the Metropolitan assured Stalin of his "profound affection and gratitude" and vowed to "safeguard the Church against mistakes and false steps".

On February 2, 1945, with Stalin's approval, Alexius I was elected Patriarch of Moscow and all of Russia and enthroned on February 4, 1945.

In 1946 Alexius I presided over the controversial "re-unification" of the Ukrainian Greek Catholic Church with ROC seen by many as a takeover forced by the Stalinist government.

Also in 1946, Patriarch Alexius called on all Catholics in the Soviet Union to reject all allegiance to the Pope: "Liberate yourself! You must break the Vatican chains, which throw you into the abyss of error, darkness and spiritual decay. Hurry, return to your true mother, the Russian Orthodox Church!"

Pope Pius XII replied: "Who does not know, that Patriarch Alexius I recently elected by the dissident bishops of Russia, openly exalts and preaches defection from the Catholic Church. In a letter lately addressed to the Ruthenian Church, a letter, which contributed not a little to the persecution?"

Patriarch Alexius joined the World Peace Council, "a Soviet front organization," when it was founded in 1949. According to Christopher Andrew and Vasili Mitrokhin, both Patriarch Alexius and Metropolitan Nicholas "were highly valued by the KGB as agents of influence."

After the death of Stalin on March 5, 1953, the Patriarch composed a personal statement of condolence to the USSR's Council of Ministers. It read, "His death is a heavy grief for our Fatherland and for all the people who inhabit it. The whole Russian Orthodox Church, which will never forget his benevolent attitude to Church needs, feels great sorrow at his death. The bright memory of him will live ineradicably in our hearts. Our Church proclaims eternal memory to him with a special feeling of abiding love."

In 1955, Patriarch Alexius declared, "The Russian Orthodox Church supports the totally peaceful foreign policy of the Soviet Union, not because the Church lacks freedom, but because Soviet policy is just and corresponds to the Christian ideals which the Church preaches."

From 1959 however, the Russian Orthodox Church also had to endure a new wave of persecution, mostly carried out on the orders of the new Soviet leader Nikita Khrushchev.

Despite this, Patriarch Alexius was permitted by the KGB to enroll the Russian Orthodox Church into the Christian Peace Conference in 1958 and the World Council of Churches in 1961.

In 1965, Fathers Gleb Yakunin and Nikolai Eshilman wrote an open letter to Patriarch Alexius. According to Evgeny Barabanov, "They showed convincingly how a significant part of the governing episcopate, with voluntary silence or cunning connivance, had assisted the Atheists to close churches, monasteries, and religious schools, to liquidate religious communities, to establish the illegal practice of registering christenings, and had yielded to them control over the assignment and transfer of priests."

The letter was published as samizdat ("self-published", i.e., underground press). In May 1966, Patriarch Alexius ordered both priests suspended from the ministry. Soviet dissident Aleksandr Solzhenitsyn sharply criticized the treatment of Fathers Gleb and Nikolai in his own open letter to Patriarch Alexius.

Patriarch Alexius died of a myocardial infarction at the age of 92 in 1970 and was buried in the Trinity Lavra of St. Sergius at Sergiyev Posad outside of Moscow.

Evaluation
Supporters praise Alexius I for working hard to ensure the survival of the Christianity in Russia, advocating peace and inter-church unity, while opponents often accused him of complicity with the Soviet authorities.

A leading critic of Patriarch Alexei's leadership was Father Gleb Yakunin who claimed in his books and articles that the postwar hierarchy of the Russian Orthodox Church was controlled by KGB informants.

References

Bibliography
 

1877 births
1970 deaths
People from Moskovsky Uyezd
Metropolitans and Patriarchs of Moscow
Members of the Union of the Russian People
Persecution of Catholics
Christian Peace Conference members
Russian Orthodox clergy who spied for the Soviet Union
Russian military personnel of World War I
Recipients of the Order of St. Vladimir, 3rd class
Recipients of the Order of the Red Banner of Labour
Recipients of the Order of the Star of the Romanian Socialist Republic
Imperial Moscow University alumni
Russian bishops